The 1934 Humboldt State Lumberjacks football team represented Humboldt State College during the 1934 college football season. They competed as an independent.

The 1934 Lumberjacks were led by head coach Fred Telonicher in his eighth and final year at the helm. They played home games at Albee Stadium in Eureka, California. Humboldt State finished with a record of one win and three losses (1–3). The Lumberjacks were outscored by their opponents 31–57 for the four-game season. In the eight years Telonicher was coach, the Lumberjacks compiled a record of 8–23–2.

Schedule

Notes

References

Humboldt State
Humboldt State Lumberjacks football seasons
Humboldt State Lumberjacks football